Chuah Guat Eng (born 1 December 1943), is a Malaysian Peranakan Chinese writer. She was Malaysia's first English-language woman novelist.

Chuah was born in Rembau, Negeri Sembilan, and received her early education at the Methodist Girls' School, Klang and Victoria Institution, Kuala Lumpur.

She read English Literature at University of Malaya, Kuala Lumpur, and German Literature at Ludwig-Maximilian University, Munich. She then received a PhD from National University of Malaysia in 2008 for her thesis "From Conflict to Insight: A Zen-based Reading Procedure for the Analysis of Fiction".

Works
 Echoes of Silence 
 Tales from the Baram River 
 The Old House & Other Stories 
 Days of Change

References

External links
 
 Time Out KL, October 2009
 Chapter 2 from her Echoes of Silence
 Review of 'Dream Stuff' by Chuah Guat Eng
 How To Create A Fictional World According To Chuah Guat Eng, by Emad El-Din Aysha

1943 births
Living people
Malaysian women writers
English-language writers from Malaysia
Peranakan people in Malaysia
20th-century Malaysian writers
21st-century Malaysian writers
20th-century Malaysian women writers
21st-century Malaysian women writers